Fihavanana is a Malagasy word encompassing the Malagasy concept of kinship, friendship, goodwill between beings, both physical and spiritual. The literal translation is difficult to capture, as the Malagasy culture applies the concept in unique ways. Its origin is havana, meaning kin.

Malagasy culture is full of proverbs related to fihavanana: “Ny Fihavanana no taloha ny vola”, which loosely translated means “The relationship is more important than the money”. But fihavanana is more than just “relationship”. It comes from the belief that we are all one blood and that how we treat others will eventually be reflected back to us; and that we should be proactive about goodwill for the good of the world. Fihavanana is not limited to the present but can also be applied to our relationship with the spiritual world.

The concept is thus similar to the Southern African ubuntu (philosophy)

References 

Malagasy culture
Malagasy words and phrases